St. Wolfgang's Church in Schneeberg is one of the largest hall churches of the Late Gothic in Saxon region of Germany. It was built in the early 16th century on parts of a small, earlier building and is an early example of a Reformation church building. Due to its dominant position on the summit of the Schneeberg hill, which in previous centuries had been riddled (durchörtet) with mining pits and galleries, it became known as the "Miners' Cathedral" (Bergmannsdom). The parish of St. Wolfgang in Schneeberg owns this summer church as well as the hospital church, the Church of the Trinity, Schneeberg on the Fürstenplatz as their winter church. In addition the parish of St. George & St. Martin, Griesbach, also belongs to the Lutheran-Evangelical parish of Schneeberg.

References

Literature 
 Jenny Lagaude: Der Cranach-Altar zu St. Wolfgang in Schneeberg. Ein Bildprogramm zwischen Spätmittelalter und Reformation. Leipzig; Berlin, 2010. .
 Uwe Gerig (ed.): Schneeberg, Ruth Gerig Verlag, 1994, ; Die Kirche "St. Wolfgang", pages 26–31

External links  

 Internet article for the parish of St. Wolfgang
   Home page of the St. Wolfgang Church Church Building Association founded in 2008

Schneeberg
Schneeberg
Schneeberg, Wolfgang
Buildings and structures in Erzgebirgskreis
Schneeberg, Saxony